Abayi is an Azerbaijani dance with its origins in the Shaki and Zaqatala regions of Azerbaijan. The subject matter of the dance is middle age.

In this area middle-aged people are called "Abayi" and this kind of dance is generally performed by middle-aged men or women. Creators of the melody of this dance are the Shaki composers. It's a little exaggerated and funny and has a slow dancing tempo. This kind of dance used to be performed in groups, but later changed to an individual dance.

Azerbaijani dances